Naan Petha Magane is a 1995 Tamil-language comedy drama film directed by V. Sekhar. The film stars Manorama, Nizhalgal Ravi, Raadhika and Urvashi . It was released on 15 January 1995. Although initially received with some protest, the film went on to become a major hit at the box office.

Plot

Ravi owns a small advertising agency and is the only son of Andal who is very possessive about her son. Ravi meets Indra, an open minded advocate and both fall in love. However, Andal dislikes Indra fearing that she might separate Ravi from Andal as Indra voices out against gender/social inequalities frequently. Andal disapproves their wedding plan. Ravi has no option than to let go his love for Indra. Instead, Andal arranges Ravi’s wedding with a naïve girl Uma Maheswari who hails from a village.

Ravi, although not interested in this wedding proposal with Uma, agrees for the sake of Andal. Slowly, Ravi gels well with Uma and they start leading a happy life. However, Andal feels possessive about Ravi and thinks that Uma is Ravi’s first priority and fears that Uma would start dominating her. So, Andal starts picking up frequent quarrels with Uma. Ravi worries that all is not well between Uma and Andal, but convinces Uma to tolerate Andal’s behavior. However, Uma keeps worrying.

Andal slowly starts understanding that her possessiveness towards Ravi is the only reason for all the mess at her home and decides to apologize to Uma. However, it is too late as Uma feels dejected due to continuous nagging from Andal and lack of moral support from Ravi and commits suicide. Andal gets arrested by the cops on the grounds of suspected murder. At this point, Indra comes to rescue and appears on behalf of Andal in the court. Indra discovers a letter written by Uma stating that she is going to commit suicide and argues that this is not a murder. Andal is acquitted from the case but feels guilty that she is responsible for Uma’s death. The movie ends with a message that mothers should not be over possessive with their sons especially post wedding.

Cast

Manorama as Aandal
Nizhalgal Ravi as Ravi
Raadhika as Indra
Urvashi as Uma Maheswari
Goundamani as K. D. Varadarajan
Senthil
Vadivelu
Kovai Sarala as Devi
V. Gopalakrishnan as Indra's father
Kumarimuthu
Shanmugasundari as Sundari
C. K. Saraswathi as K. D. Varadarajan's Mother
Theni Kunjarammal as Maragatham
Nithya Ravindran
Radhabai
P.S Seethalakshmi
Gemini Rajeshwari
Idichapuli Selvaraj
Bonda Mani
Thideer Kannaiah as Nair
Major Sundarrajan as Judge

Soundtrack

The film score and the soundtrack were composed by Chandrabose, with lyrics written by Vaali.

References

External links

1990s Tamil-language films
1995 drama films
1995 films
Films directed by V. Sekhar
Films scored by Chandrabose (composer)
Indian drama films